When the World is Wide is the debut studio album by Japanese indie rock band Ykiki Beat. It was released on July 22, 2015 by P-Vine Records.

Track listing

Personnel
Ykiki Beat
Nobuki Akiyama – lead vocals, guitar
Kohei Kamoto - guitar
Koki Nozue - synthesizer
Yotaro Kachi - bass
Mizuki Sekiguchi - drums

Additional personal
Yujiro Yonetsu - production
Tom McFall - mixing
Yoshirotten - artworks
Yu Nakazato - A&R
Takuya Yamaguchi - management
Hiroki Sakida - management

Charts

Weekly chart

Release history

References

External links
 

2015 debut albums
Japanese-language albums
P-Vine Records albums